L'Amande, founded in 1884, is an Italian company that manufactures Marseille soap. It is now one of the oldest soap brands in the world.

References

External links
Official Website
CBD Bath & Beauty

Manufacturing companies established in 1884
Italian brands
Soap brands
1884 establishments in Italy